Eduardo Hernández Saucedo (born January 19, 2001), known professionally as Ed Maverick, is a Mexican singer, songwriter, musician, producer and multi-instrumentalist of folk, alternative and rock music. He started his music career a solo artist, by sharing his songs on social media platforms. Maverick gained fame after the release of his debut album, Mix Pa' Llorar en Tu Cuarto (2018) and his hit single in Mexico "Fuentes de Ortiz", later certified diamond by the Asociación Mexicana de Productores de Fonogramas y Videogramas. After signing a record deal with Universal Music Mexico in 2019, his debut album was reissued and previously reached the number two of the Mexican album charts, followed by the studio album Transiciones (2019).

In 2021, he released the acclaimed self-titled Eduardo (2021); and C. Tangana's "Párteme la Cara", included in El Madrileño (2021); the song reached the top 5 on the Spanish Single Charts, and earned him the Latin Grammy Award for Best Engineered Album (as music engineer) and an Odeon Award. He has also collaborated with artists such as Bratty and Señor Kino, as well as receiving multiple nominations at the MTV Millennial Awards and the MTV Europe Music Awards. By April 2022, Maverick had already sold 850,000 digital records worldwide. He is also a member of the band Los Milagro, with Daniel Quién and producer Wet Baes, Los Milagro has no official commercial discography or record label, staying as a project of sporadic live performances.

Bio

2001-2017: early years 
Eduardo was born on January 19, 2001, in Delicias, a town located in the Mexican state of Chihuahua. He taught himself to play the guitar. The first song he learned to play was Jake Bugg's "Simple As This". He began composing in his hometown in addition to performing at parties, events and other public places in mid-2017. Among his influences to start composing are some Mexican artists such as Dromedarios Mágicos, Juan Cirerol and Little Jesus.

2018-2020: MPLLETC, Transiciones and rise to fame 

In 2018, Maverick released his debut studio album entitled Mix pa' llorar en tu cuarto through the independent record label Eidan Box Records. The song "Fuentes de Ortiz", his second song written by himself was included on the album; and with the passing of the months went viral on social media and would end up becoming his first commercial success, after signing a contract with Universal Music Mexico and GST Talent in 2019, his debut album was reissued in physical stores and digital platforms under the Universal label, which reached number two on the Mexican Albums Chart, "Acurrucar" was released as the second single from the album.

By May 2019, Maverick had already become one of the most viral Mexican artists on Spotify. That same year he performed for the first time at the National Auditurium's "Lunario" and the Teatro Metropolitán in Mexico City, setting the record for being the Mexican artist who sold out his dates at the venue the fastest. In the same year his debut album received a gold record from the Asociación Mexicana de Productores de Fonogramas (AMPROFON). He released his second studio album Transiciones (2019).

Through his rapidly growing fame in Mexico, Maverick suffered from a massive attack perpetuated by fans and some digital creators on social networks, receiving almost daily messages inciting hate, suicide and death threats directly towards him and his family. In November 2019, he released a statement through Twitter in which he explained that he would close his account and stay away of the media for a while. In the external statement:

In 2020 he reappeared with his first live album Ed Maverick en el Metropólitan (2020) performing the hits of the first two albums and included the song "Ropa de Bazar" with Bratty, and at the beginning of the same year the AMPROFON gave him the diamond record for "Fuentes de Ortiz" for selling 300,000 digital copies, double platinum for "Acurrucar", platinum and gold for "Del Río" and "Ropa de Bazar", platinum for "Quiero" and Mix Pa' Llorar en Tu Cuarto, and the gold record for "Siempre Estoy Pa' Ti" and "WRU". In addition to the release of his debut extended play Esto No Tiene Nada Que Ver con Eduardo.

2021-present: Eduardo 
During 2021, Maverick released his third studio album titled Eduardo, in which the events of the harassment episode in his life were reflected in the songs "Gente", "Niño," and "Gracias". The Rolling Stone magazine ranked it 26 at the 35 best Spanish-language albums of 2021. In the same year he collaborated with C. Tangana, on the song "Párteme la cara" included on the album El Madrileño (2021) reaching the number three on the singles chart in Spain, he obtained his first certification outside of Mexico with a platinum single by the Productores de Música de España (PROMUSICAE) and a gold single in Brazil. This collaboration credited him as album engineer and earned him his first Latin Grammy Award for Best Engineered Album at the 22nd ceremony. He also formed Los Milagro, a band with Mexican musician Daniel Quién and producer Wet Baes.

In 2022 he won the Odeon Award from the Intellectual Rights Management Association (AGDI) for the Best Alternative Song of 2022 in Spain, being the first Mexican artist awarded at that ceremony. In April he performed for the first time at the Coachella music festival, in May he released a series of demos from the Eduardo album.

In July, the Cartagena City Council recognized him at the Spanish festival "La Mar de Músicas" with the 2nd Paco Martín Award for "Breakthrough Artist of Global Music" at the proposal of the jury made up of different Spanish journalists from the Paco Martín Cultural Association, explaining them choice for Maverick «He represents like nobody else the new wave of singers who dazzle with their sensitivity, simplicity and naturalness. His voice, deep, melancholy, warm and full of nuances, is one of the most special on the international scene. He provokes emotion, intimacy and pause from the first verse, as if he were singing to us a few meters away accompanied by his young guitar». In the same month he announced his first world tour entitled "Tour Eduardo", with which he will perform in cities from Latin America and the United States, and for the first time in European countries such as the United Kingdom, Spain and the Netherlands.

Discography 
Studio albums

 Mix Pa' Llorar en tu Cuarto (2018)
 Transiciones (2019)
 Eduardo (2021)

Awards and nominations

References

Notes

External links
 
 

Living people
Mexican male singer-songwriters
Mexican singer-songwriters
Mexican male composers
Mexican folk guitarists
Mexican male guitarists
2001 births
Singers from Chihuahua (state)
People from Delicias, Chihuahua
21st-century Mexican singers
Latin Grammy Award winners